Marvel Disk Wars: The Avengers is an anime television series produced by Toei Animation in collaboration with Walt Disney Japan and Marvel Entertainment. After the evil villain Loki uses Tony Stark's own technology to trap several heroes and villains inside containers known as DISKs, a group of five kids end up with the power to unleash these superheroes. Teaming up with Captain America, Iron Man, the Hulk, Thor, and Wasp, the kids travel the world searching for the DISKs before they fall into his evil hands. The series began airing in Japan on TV Tokyo and other TXN stations from April 2, 2014. An English dub began airing on July 6, 2015 on Disney XD (Southeast Asia).

Episode list

References 

Marvel Disk Wars
class=List